Birger Møller-Pedersen (born 11 November 1949) is a computer scientist and professor at the University of Oslo, department of informatics. He published numerous works on object-oriented programming and has contributed to the creation of the BETA programming language, which is a descendant of Simula.

Academic work

Møller-Pedersen is a professor at the department of informatics at the University of Oslo, Norway. He teaches courses mainly in compiler design and programming languages.

References

External links
University of Oslo
Department of Informatics
Personal homepage

Academic staff of the University of Oslo
Computer programmers
Living people
1949 births